Tabrizicola fusiformis is a Gram-negative, aerobic, fusiform-shaped and motile bacterium from the genus of Tabrizicola which has been isolated from activated sludge from an industrial wastewater treatment plant.

References 

Rhodobacteraceae
Bacteria described in 2018